ASCI Blue Pacific was a supercomputer installed at the Lawrence Livermore National Laboratory (LLNL) in Livermore, CA at the end of 1998. It was a collaboration between IBM and LLNL.

It was an IBM RS/6000 SP massively parallel processing system. It contained 5,856 PowerPC 604e microprocessors. Its theoretical top performance was 3.9 teraflops.

It was built as a stage of the Accelerated Strategic Computing Initiative (ASCI) started by the U.S. Department of Energy and the National Nuclear Security Administration to build a simulator to replace live nuclear weapon testing following the moratorium on testing started by President George H. W. Bush in 1992 and extended by Bill Clinton in 1993.

External links
 
 

One-of-a-kind computers
Lawrence Livermore National Laboratory
IBM supercomputers